Pets Win Prizes is a game show, produced by the British Broadcasting Corporation and shown on Saturday nights on BBC 1 in the United Kingdom from 16 July 1994 to 3 August 1996. It was originally hosted by Danny Baker, but Dale Winton became the host at the start of the second series.

Format
In the first rounds, the owners' pets competed in games of skill and agility - depending on what animal they were, this could vary from snail racing to dog pool. The owner whose pet won each game had to randomly choose between two envelopes, one of which contained a prize for them, and the other a prize for their pet.

The final round took the form of a 3-minute quick-fire quiz, where the owners had to answer animal-related trivia questions. For every correct answer, a cardboard representation of their animal moved along a race track; five correct answers were required to reach the end. The first player to the end of the track (or the one with the most correct answers after 3 minutes) was declared the winner.

The prize for the final was determined by a cat known as "The Professor", who would be placed on the centre of a hexagonal board, which was divided into six sections, each of which corresponded to a prize. The owner won the prize from whichever section The Professor's front paws were in after 30 seconds.

Production
The first series of Pets Win Prizes was presented by Danny Baker. Baker was dropped from the show at the end of the first series, following a dispute with the BBC. He was replaced by Dale Winton, who had recently become a popular television personality through hosting the game show Supermarket Sweep.

Reception
The first series of Pets Win Prizes proved popular with audiences, even if it was heavily criticised by reviewers in the press. One episode in series one had over 7.5 million viewers. James Rampton, writing in The Independent, suggested that "The secret of its success is that it doesn't take itself too seriously".

Transmissions

References

External links

BBC television game shows
1990s British game shows
1994 British television series debuts
1996 British television series endings
Pets in the United Kingdom
English-language television shows